Mihnea Ioan Motoc is a Romanian diplomat who served as Minister of Defence of Romania between November 2015 and January 2017, in the Cioloș Cabinet . Before this appointment, he was the country's ambassador to the European Union between 2008 and 2015, and briefly the country's ambassador to the United Kingdom. He is currently the Principal Adviser in the European Commission's Inspire, Debate, Engage and Accelerate Action (IDEA) department.

Work history 
Motoc has been a Romanian diplomat since the early 1990s, when he joined the Ministry of Foreign Affairs of Romania. For most of the 1990s Motoc spent time in various Romanian government posts. He joined the United Nations in 2003, where he spent five years working as the Permanent Representative of Romania. In 2008 he left his post at the UN to become the Permanent Representative of Romania to the European Union. He held this position until becoming Ambassador of Romania to London for a few months in 2015. In November 2015, he was appointed Minister of Defence in the Cioloș Cabinet and held the position until January 2017.

Education 
Motoc studied law at the University of Bucharest from 1984 until 1989. Following this he went on to achieve a Certificate of post-graduate studies in Private International Law from the University of Nice in 1991 and a Master's Degree in Public International and Comparative Law from George Washington University a year later.

Honors
 Commander, National Order for Merit (Romania)
 President of National Security Authority
 Head of the Romanian Negotiations Team with the NATO
 Conducted negotiations within UN, Council of Europe, OSCE, EU and Neighboring Treaties negotiations
 Member of the Permanent Inter-ministerial Committee for European Integration
 Monitor for ”acquis communautaire” on Common Foreign Security Policy
 President of the Inter-Departmental Commission for Romania's accession to NATO
 National Coordinator of the Stability Pact for South Eastern Europe
 Member of the International Humanitarian Fact-Finding Commission
 Vice-chairman for the Executive Council of the Organization for the Prohibition of Chemical Weapons

Personal life
Mihnea Motoc was born on 11 November 1966 in Bucharest. He is fluent in English and French. He is married to Iulia Motoc, Judge at the European Court of Human Rights with whom he has one son, Luca-Mihnea.

References
 Interview in Deutsche Welle

Living people
1966 births
Romanian Ministers of Defence
Permanent Representatives of Romania to the European Union
Permanent Representatives of Romania to the United Nations
Ambassadors of Romania to the United Kingdom
Recipients of the National Order of Merit (Romania)